Niall Christopher Lovelock is an English footballer who plays as a defender for Keynsham Town.

Career
Lovelock signed as a scholar for Bristol Rovers in May 2020 having previously played for Bath City.

On 13 October 2021, Lovelock made his senior debut in an EFL Trophy tie against Chelsea U21s when he unfortunately equalised for the opposition, turning the ball into his own net as the academy side defeated Lovelock's side 2–1.

In November 2021, Lovelock joined Cirencester Town on loan.

Following his release from Bristol Rovers at the end of the 2021–22 season, Lovelock joined Larkhall Athletic, joining Keynsham Town in October. In March 2023, Lovelock agreed to join Eastern Florida State College at the end of the season on a scholarship.

Career Statistics

References

Living people
English footballers
Association football defenders
Bath City F.C. players
Bristol Rovers F.C. players
Cirencester Town F.C. players
Larkhall Athletic F.C. players
Keynsham Town F.C. players
Southern Football League players
Western Football League players
Year of birth missing (living people)